This was the first edition of the tournament.

Anett Kontaveit won the title, defeating Irina-Camelia Begu in the final, 7–6(7–5), 6–4. It was Kontaveit's second WTA title (not counting Melbourne) and her first since 's-Hertogenbosch in 2017.

Seeds

Draw

Finals

Top half

Bottom half

Qualifying

Seeds

Qualifiers

Lucky losers

Qualifying draw

First qualifier

Second qualifier

Third qualifier

Fourth qualifier

References

External links
Main draw
Qualifying draw

Tennis in the Land - Singles
Tennis in Cleveland